The Charlotte Correctional Institution  is a state prison for men located in Punta Gorda, Charlotte County, Florida, owned and operated by the Florida Department of Corrections.  This facility has a mix of security levels, including minimum, medium, and close, and houses adult male prisoners.  Charlotte first opened in 1989 and has a maximum capacity of 1291 prisoners.

A 2015 grand jury report delivered a "blistering and graphic rebuke" to the department for the beating death of Charlotte inmate Matthew Walker on April 11, 2014 at the hands of guards.  Reporters John Hackworth and Brian Gleason of Sun Coast Media Group were awarded the 2016 Pulitzer Prize for Editorial Writing for their reporting on Walker's death.

Inmate Robert Peterkin was found dead on June 4, 2015, in circumstances that officials refused to explain to his family.  Inmate Quonta Howard was found dead on August 4, 2015.  His death became the seventh ongoing criminal investigation at CCI.

Notable Inmates
Tony Ables - serial killer
Lionel Tate - murderer and the youngest person in U.S history to be sentenced to life imprisonment without parole.
Terrence Graham - former burglar who won a Supreme Court case that banned juvenile life without parole for non homicide offenses.

Sources

Prisons in Florida
Buildings and structures in Charlotte County, Florida
1989 establishments in Florida